Myripristis astakhovi is a species of soldierfish from the genus Myripristis. It is endemic to Nha Trang Bay, Vietnam in the Western Pacific Ocean. It was named in honour of ichthyologist Dmitri Alekseevich Astakhov.

References

astakhovi
Fish of the Pacific Ocean
Taxa named by Aleksandr Nicholaevich Kotlyar